Robert Maillet (born October 26, 1969) is a Canadian actor and retired professional wrestler. He is known for his time in the World Wrestling Federation (WWF) from 1997 to 1999, where he performed under the ring name Kurrgan and was a member of The Truth Commission and The Oddities. He is also known for his roles in films such as 300 (2007), Sherlock Holmes (2009), Immortals (2011), Pacific Rim (2013), Brick Mansions (2014), Hercules (2014), and Deadpool 2 (2018).

Early life
Maillet was born in Georgetown, Ontario near Toronto and Mississauga. Less than a year later, his family moved to Ste-Marie-de-Kent, New Brunswick, a French-Acadian village where he grew up.

Professional wrestling career
He began wrestling as the Acadian Giant in the early 90s. Maillet made an initial appearance in the WWF on November 11, 1991 when he wrestled as The Cajun Giant, defeating Bob Bradley in a dark match at a television taping in Utica, NY. He worked for Super World of Sports as Giant Goliath in 1991. He also spent some working for the Japanese W*ING promotion as Goliath El Gigante.

He was signed to the WWF in 1997, alongside The Jackyl, as a member of The Truth Commission. The group was sent to the United States Wrestling Association (USWA) before being called up to the main WWF roster, where Maillet's ring name evolved into The Interrogator and later to Kurrgan (whose name was inspired by The Kurgan, and was occasionally referred to as Kurrgan the Interrogator on television). Under the tutelage of The Jackyl, a charismatic cult leader, Kurrgan was a heel known for applying the Iron Claw to his opponents and not breaking the hold until The Jackyl slapped him across the face.

After The Truth Commission disbanded, Maillet (now billed simply as Kurrgan) continued as a singles wrestler managed by The Jackyl. He later went on to be part of The Oddities, The Jackyl's new stable; however, once The Jackyl was removed as the advisor of The Oddities and replaced by the Insane Clown Posse, The Oddities turned face and became fan favourites. Maillet later worked for Jacques Rougeau's wrestling events as Kurgan. On July 8, 2005, he wrestled Jim Duggan.

Acting career
Maillet appeared in the 2006 film 300, an adaptation of Frank Miller's graphic novel of the same name. He played the Über-Immortal, a savage berserker who was part of the enemy's imperial guard. In November 2008, during a fight scene for the 2009 film Sherlock Holmes, he accidentally punched Robert Downey Jr. in the face, bloodying Downey and knocking him down. Downey later stated on an episode of the Late Show with David Letterman that Maillet was "10 times more upset about it" than he was.

Maillet played a Russian professional boxer who takes a dive in the 2011 film The Big Bang. Later that year, he appeared in the film Monster Brawl as Frankenstein in a wrestling tournament of eight classic monsters that fight to the death. He played Polyphemus in the 2013 film Percy Jackson: Sea of Monsters, Blackwell in the 2013 film adaptation of The Mortal Instruments: City of Bones, and the executioner in the 2014 film Hercules.

He also had a recurring role on the Syfy original series Haven billed as a "Heavy", a thug for the series antagonist. In 2018, Maillet had a small part in the superhero film Deadpool 2 as Sluggo, a mutant mercenary who is in prison alongside the titular character. He also had a part in the 2018 Netflix film Game Over, Man!. He appeared in the 2020 film Becky alongside Kevin James.

Personal life
Maillet has been married to Laura Eaton since June 13, 1997. He has two stepdaughters, as well as a daughter adopted from Ethiopia. Being an Acadian, his first language is French and he is conversant in English.

Filmography

Film

Television

Championships and accomplishments
Atlantic Grand Prix Wrestling
AGPW Continental Championship (1 time)
NWA: Extreme Canadian Championship Wrestling
NWA/ECCW Heavyweight Championship (2 times)
Legend City Wrestling
LCW Newfoundland Tag Team Championship (1 time) - with Mr. Fantastic
Real Action Wrestling
RAW Heavyweight Championship (1 time)
United States Wrestling Association
USWA World Tag Team Championship (3 times)  with Recon
Wrestling Observer Newsletter awards
Worst Tag Team (1998)  with Golga
Worst Gimmick (1998)  as Kurrgan,as part of The Oddities

See also
 List of tallest people

References

External links
 

1969 births
Acadian people
Canadian male film actors
Canadian male television actors
Canadian male professional wrestlers
Living people
Male actors from New Brunswick
People from Kent County, New Brunswick
Professional wrestlers from New Brunswick
Professional wrestlers from Ontario
USWA World Tag Team Champions